La Flor de Irupé is a 1962 Argentine film.

Cast
 Libertad Leblanc
 Luis Alarcón
 Héctor Pellegrini
 Mario Amaya
 Alberto Barcel

External links
 

1962 films
1960s Spanish-language films
Argentine black-and-white films
1960s Argentine films